St Clement's Church is an evangelical Church of England parish church situated just to the east of central Oxford, England.

History
The present church dates from the 1820s, but replaced a much older building, which was demolished in 1829.

The old church 

St Clement's Church originally stood at what is now The Plain roundabout, where the roads from London and Henley cross the River Cherwell at Magdalen Bridge. It served both the small community of Bruggeset ("Bridge Settlement") that surrounded it as well as the largely rural area that eventually became East Oxford. The first written record mentioning the church was in 1122 when it was one of the royal chapels given to St Frideswide's Priory by King Henry I. Almost nothing is known of the appearance of the earliest church building, but recent scholarship suggests that a stone head now in the Ashmolean Museum may have originally been a brightly painted stone corbel from the 13th century church, suggesting that the earliest parishioners would have worshipped in a space rich in colour and carved stonework .

In 1323, money was granted for the rebuilding of "the Church of St Clement beyond Petty Pont" (Magdalen Bridge) Most of the building demolished in 1829 dated from this time.

John Peshall, writing in 1773 describes a church "composed of one isle thirteen yards long (exclusive of a chancel) and six yards and twenty inches broad. On the north-east and west side are galleries. Over the latter is a small capp’d tiled tower containing three bells".

The churchyard was extended in 1781

The capped tower was replaced by a square one in 1816. John Henry Newman added a gallery to accommodate a new Sunday school in 1825, with Newman's friend Edward Pusey providing a stove for the children.

Civil War 
St Clement's parish register for 1643 (OS) records "Capt. Slade, shot to death buried 12th Sept." and "Jan (9) Francis Cole executed for a spie & buried beside ye church privately without any ceremonie". During the Siege of Oxford (1644-1646) the church and parish were literally on the front line between the Parliamentary forces on Headington Hill and the Royalists in the city. It was reported that, as a consequence, "no parish suffered more severely" with whole streets being demolished to facilitate the building of fortifications or to prevent the enemy from taking cover. The 17th century Black Horse Inn and the church were among the few buildings to survive.

Growth and change 
In the early 1800s, slum clearances in Oxford saw St Clement's expand rapidly, with over three hundred new "houses being built between 1821 and 1824". The old church was small, seating 250, and services were "… very much interrupted and annoyed by the continued noise of carriages passing to and fro …", so a plan was formed to build a new church on a new site to accommodate the growing population.

As the then rector, Revd John Gutch, was in his 80s, the decision was made to appoint a curate to assist him and to raise money for the new church.

John Henry Newman, later Cardinal Newman and then Saint John Henry Newman, became curate in 1824. Although he was only at St Clement's for two years, Newman had an enormous impact on the parish, becoming widely respected as "a proper minister".  He visited every home in the parish, started a Sunday school and preached regularly to a packed church.

The new church 

Thanks to Newman's fundraising, the present church was constructed in 1827–28. It was built by John Hudson of Oxford at a cost of £6,032 19s 5d on land in Hacklingcroft Meadow, given by Sir John Lock. The church had originally invited designs along the lines of Salisbury Cathedral or a Grecian temple but settled on an Anglo-Norman design on the grounds of cost.

The architect was Daniel Robertson, who went on to design the Clarendon Press buildings in Walton Street. St Clement's is an early example of the Anglo-Norman or Romanesque Revival  style, although Pevsner describes it as "patently Georgian Norman". The architect estimated that the new church could seat up to 1024 people.

The site was chosen in the expectation that new housing would expand along Marston Lane (now Marston Road). The original plan would have placed the church on Marston Lane, but it was moved to its current position as part of a revised plan, subsequently abandoned, to build streets and houses in the form of a square.

Legality of marriages in the new church 
St Clement's was the first church in Oxford to be built on a new site since the Middle Ages. One unforeseen consequence of the new location was that it did not automatically become the parish church when it was consecrated in 1828. Unfortunately, this was not realised at the time necessitating a special Act of Parliament in 1836 to ensure the legality of all the marriages that had taken place in the new church.

Schools 1839-1958 
In 1839, the Rector and churchwardens bought the former Baptist chapel in George Street (now Cave Street) and converted it into schools for boys, girls and infants in response to the growing population. St Clement's infants' school moved to a new site in Bath Street in 1874 following criticisms about the state of the George Street buildings by government inspectors. New buildings were provided for the girls' school  in Boulter Street in 1891. The girls also benefited from the use of St Clement's Mission Hall for assemblies and, later, as a school canteen. The boys' school moved to a new site, provided by the Morrell family, in Cross Street in 1903.  Following a reduction in pupil numbers, the girls' school merged with the boys' school at the Cross Street site in 1929. In 1956, senior pupils moved to the nearby secondary modern school, whilst the infants merged with the juniors at Cross Street until that, too, closed in 1958. The Cross Street site was subsequently acquired by St Clement's Parish Property for church and community use.

Development of the church building 19th-21st centuries 
The interior underwent a major refurbishment in the 1870s. In 1871 the original Georgian box-pews and benches were replaced by the present ‘Neo-Norman’ pews, arranged in four blocks divided by a newly tiled nave and two newly positioned side aisles. The West Gallery was taken down in 1876. The refurbishments were the work of Edward George Bruton (1826-1899), an Oxford-based architect who specialised in ecclesiastical commissions in Oxfordshire and Buckinghamshire and were largely paid for by members of the wealthy Morrell brewing family of Headington Hill Hall. The Morrells were closely associated with St Clement's for much of the 19th and early 20th centuries and were significant benefactors to the church and parish.

The late 20th and early 21st centuries saw several reordering exercises in the church building including the creation of a crèche and kitchen (1973), creating a dais in the chancel area (1984)  and the installation of disabled access (2005).

In 2020-21 the organ and several pews were removed to create a more flexible space in the east of the church building.

The present 
The current congregation is drawn from all around the Oxford area and reflects a wide diversity of ages and backgrounds.

In addition to the church building, many church and community activities take place at The Old Mission Hall ("The Mish") on Boulter Street and St Clement's Centre on Cross Street.

St Clement's normally holds Sunday services at 10:30 and 18:30 with children and young people either attending the morning service with their families or having their own activities at "The Mish".  Mid-week activities include:

 Home groups
 Youth activities at "The Mish"
 A popular Baby and Toddler Group
 Café Club - for older people and others who are around during the day

St Clement's is a partner church in the Oxford Churches Debt Centre

The church's professional staff consists of the Rector, Revd Rachel Gibson (since 2015), the Assistant Curate, Revd Dr Joanna Tarassenko (since July 2021), a Parish Administration Manager a Children and Families Worker and a Youth Worker. Leadership is shared with two churchwardens and many day-to-day activities are supported or led by a body of active volunteers.

Bells 
St Clement's has three bells, all brought from the old church in the 1820s. The two larger bells were later removed from the tower and are now on display in the church entrance.

 The largest bell  is 21½ inches in diameter and was made at the Woodstock foundry. The inscription reads RICHARD SHVRLY ROBERT GRIFFIN C W 1636
 The second bell is 20½ inches in diameter. Based on its shape, it has been identified as dating from the late 13th century making it the oldest bell in Oxford
The small suance bell is the only one still in the tower, although it is not rung. It was made by Edward Hemins at his foundry in Bicester. The inscription reads: + W: HACKINS. E:HARRIS CHURCH-WARDENS E: HEMINS. BISSITER. FECIT. 1731

Music 
The first professional musician mentioned in the church records is a Mr H Pitts who was appointed in 1843 at an annual salary of £3 3s; the clarinet cost £3 15s.

St Clement's first organ was purchased at a cost of about £200 in 1846 and installed in the west gallery. In 1876 it was moved to the south-east corner of the church next to the chancel when the gallery was demolished.

In 1897-99 a new organ was built by Messrs Martin & Coate of 54-55 Pembroke Street, St Clement's (now Rectory Road) from a specification drawn up by Dr TW Dodd, the organist, who was also organist of The Queen's College. The old organ was sold to St Paul's Church, Walton Street, Oxford (now Freud's nightclub). The new organ was first used at the special service for Queen Victoria's Diamond Jubilee in 1897. An electric blower was installed in 1931 and the organ was rebuilt in 1952 by Nicholson's of Worcester who also installed a modern detached console. The cost of maintenance and changes in worship styles since the late 20th century led to the organ falling into disuse and it was removed in early 2020 by Michael Farley of Siddenham.

Since the late 20th century, music for worship has been increasingly provided by a worship group using a range of traditional and electronic instruments. This has been accompanied by the increased use of contemporary worship songs alongside traditional hymns. The church also holds a monthly Taizé service.

During the pandemic of 2020–21, when public worship, including singing and music, was curtailed, St Clement's musicians responded by recording music in their homes for use during online services.

Windows 

The striking east window (geographical north) at the front of the church shows ten scenes from the life of Christ. It is made of painted glass and is the work of Isaac Hugh Russell, a "poor but talented" artist  who lived and worked in Caroline Street, St Clement's. It was commissioned in 1846 and installed in 1847.

The four north windows (geographical west) depict scenes on the theme of faith. They were made in memory of James Morrell the Younger (1810–1863) by A and WH O’Connor for St Martin's Church, Carfax in 1865 and moved to St Clement's in 1896, when St Martin's was demolished.

The "Seven Churches" window in the north-west corner of the church was given by Emily Alicia Morrell of Headington Hill Hall in memory of her late husband, George Herbert Morrell, MP (1845-1906). It is based on Christ's letters to the Seven Churches of Asia in Revelation (1:12–3:22). The subject is unusual, and suggests a deliberate choice by Mrs Morrell of a Bible passage of particular relevance to her or her family. The window is of painted glass and was installed in 1908. It was designed by Powell & Sons of Whitefriars Glassworks, London. Powell was closely associated with William Morris and the Arts and Crafts movement. This influence is clearly apparent from features such as the use of red wings for angels.

The south windows (geographical east) are plain glass.

In 2018-21 St Clement's undertook a major project to clean and repair the windows, including the restoration of the "In Faith Love" window featuring Mary of Bethany, which had been partially dismantled when the Crèche Room was built in the 1980s and the restoration of one of the south windows which had previously been blocked off to prevent the organ becoming damp.

Churchyard 

At the new church, the original churchyard was a small area immediately around the church building.  In 1879 the Morrell family gave the church 22 perches (about 665 sq. yards) of land to extend the churchyard to the west. The Morrells donated a further acre in 1920 and this now forms the main part of the churchyard between the church building and the Marston Road. The 1920 extension was partly to provide a setting for a war memorial; The memorial was erected by Messrs WH Axtell and Son and was dedicated on 4 April 1921. A memorial scroll inside the church lists the names of St Clement's men who died during the First and Second World Wars.

The old churchyard at The Plain remained in use until the 1870s and was taken over by the City Council in 1939. The remaining memorials were moved to the top of the present churchyard in 1950. Human remains from the old churchyard which were disturbed by roadworks at The Plain and which could not be reburied at the original site were respectfully reinterred in the new churchyard in 1950 and 2009.

The planting scheme of limes along the drive continues into Headington Hill Park where they line the carriage road up to Headington Hill Hall. The last Mrs Morrell to live at Headington Hill Hall drove to church in a pony carriage as recently as the 1960s.

St Clement's sits in a "green corridor" that runs from St Cross Cemetery in the east to Warnford Lane in the west. The churchyard is gradually being developed as a peaceful haven for visitors and a rich habitat for wildlife - woodpeckers, jays, robins and even deer are frequent visitors.

Charities 
St Clement's Church has links to three charities, all of which are chaired ex-officio by the Rector.

Dawson's Charity 
The Charity of Thomas Dawson (est. 1521), also referred to as "The Dawson Trust" owns property in St Clement's the nett profits of which are used for charitable purposes. It donates money for the benefit of poorer parishioners to the Parochial Charities of St Clement, Oxford and has an Education Fund which benefits children and young people in the City of Oxford. It also contributes to the upkeep of the church building.

The Parochial Charities 
The Parochial Charities of St Clement Oxford supports the needs of older parishioners through direct financial assistance and makes grants to organisations working to alleviate poverty within the Parish. The Charity was formed in about 1959/60 from:

 Money (£2,700) received from Oxford City Council following the compulsory purchase of the Allotments for the Labouring Poor (c. 1957)
 Pike's Charity for coal
 James' Charity for grants to four poor men and six poor women of the Parish of St Clement
 Dawson's Charity allocation for the benefit of the poor

St Clement's Community Property 
St Clement's Community Property (est. 2023), formerly St Clement’s Parish Property 1903-2022), owns and maintains a small number of properties including St Clement's Centre, Cross Street and The Old Mission Hall and former Victoria Café at the corner of St Clement's Street and Boulter Street. The properties are maintained "having in view the spiritual, intellectual, moral or social wants of the inhabitants of the parish of St Clements or the immediate neighbourhood which the Rector of the parish for the time being may approve."

Clergy

Rectors 1831-1911 
1831 John William Hughes 

1850 William Strong Hore

1858 Edward Arthur Litton 

1861 John Thomson Darby

1878-1878 Henry Fermoy Dernford

1878-1911 Francis Pilcher

Rectors since 1913 
1913 Thomas William Gilbert

1918 Leslie Bradyll-Johnson

1937 Arthur Murray Thom

1947 Hon. Jonathan Malcom Atholl Kenworthy

1955 Peter John Garnett Cottingham

1969-1991 David Henry Ryder Bishop

1992-2014 Bruce Gillingham

2015- Rachel Gibson

See also
 St Clement's, Oxford
 List of churches in Oxford

References

External links
 St Clement's Church, Oxford official website
St Clement's Church, Oxford Youtube
 St Clement's Church (Oxford) information from Wikimapia

Rebuilt churches in the United Kingdom
19th-century Church of England church buildings
Clement
Churches completed in 1827